Ramola Devi Shah, better known as Chhinnalata (1923–2000) was a Nepalese writer.

Biography 
Chhinnalata (pen name) was born in 1923 in Thu, Bagh Bazar, Kathmandu, Nepal. She was married to Prince Basundhara. In 1983, she established a literary trust, Chhinnalata Geet Puraskar Guthi.

Chhinnalata died from paralysis on 4 December 2000. Chhinnalata Geet Puraskar, a music award, is named in her honour.

Patronages 
 President of the Nepal Women's Literary Association (1980-1982) [Adviser 1983-1985].

Honours 
 National honours
 Ratna Shri Swani Padak (1975).

References

Further reading 
 

1923 births
2000 deaths
20th-century Nepalese nobility
20th-century Nepalese women writers
20th-century Nepalese writers
Nepalese royalty
Nepali-language writers from Nepal
People from Kathmandu